John E. Lisman (1944 – October 20, 2017) was the Zalman Abraham Kekst Chair in Neuroscience at the Brandeis University in Waltham, Massachusetts. He was Professor of Biology, noted for his research on amplification and switching in signal transduction, memory, and neurodegenerative diseases such as ALS and Alzheimer's disease.  For his research, he was elected a Fellow of the American Association for the Advancement of Science in 2013.

Education
Lisman graduated cum laude with a bachelor's degree in physics in 1966. He completed graduate work at the Massachusetts Institute of Technology and a postdoctoral with Nobel laureate George Wald at Harvard University.

John E. Lisman Memorial Lecture in Vision Science
The John E. Lisman '66 Memorial Lecture in Vision Science is an annual award and lecture given by a leading international scholar in vision research who is selected by a committee at Brandeis University. Scholars are selected based on their extraordinary contributions to vision research and receive a $5000 prize. The scholar visits Brandeis for 1–2 days to meet faculty, students, and postdoctoral fellows, and often participates in teaching an ongoing Brandeis course.

The Lisman award is endowed by a gift from the Lifelong Vision Foundation (previously: Midwest Cornea Research Foundation), a public charity established to promote and disseminate vision research that is aimed at preserving and restoring sight. The award was initially established by Brandeis alumni Jay Pepose (BS 1975) and Susan Feigenbaum (BS 1974), and, prior to 2018, was named the Jay Pepose ’75 Award in Vision Sciences. In 2018, the award was renamed to honor the memory of John E. Lisman (1944-2017), a Brandeis alumnus (BS 1966) and faculty member from 1974 until his death in 2017.

References 

1944 births
2017 deaths
Brandeis University faculty
Massachusetts Institute of Technology alumni
Harvard University staff
American neuroscientists